Ilyes Yaiche (born October 27, 1997) is an Algerian footballer who is playing for Qadsia SC. He plays primarily as an attacking midfielder.

Club career
In June 2015, Yaiche was a member of the ASM Oran Under-18 team that won the Algerian U18 Cup, scoring a goal in the 3-1 win against USM El Harrach in the final.

In the summer of 2016, Yaiche signed a four-year contract with USM Alger.

In 2020, he signed a contract with CS Constantine.
In 2022, he signed a contract with USM Khenchela.

References

External links

1997 births
Living people
Footballers from Tizi Ouzou
Algeria youth international footballers
Algerian footballers
Algerian Ligue Professionnelle 1 players
ASM Oran players
USM El Harrach players
USM Alger players
NA Hussein Dey players
CS Constantine players
Association football midfielders
21st-century Algerian people
Expatriate footballers in Kuwait
Qadsia SC players
Kuwait Premier League players
Algerian expatriate sportspeople in Kuwait